The Mechelen transit camp, officially  in German, also known as the Dossin barracks, was a detention and deportation camp established in a former army barracks at Mechelen in German-occupied Belgium. It served as a point to gather Belgian Jews and Romani ahead of their deportation to concentration and extermination camps in Eastern Europe during the Holocaust.

The camp was established in March 1942 and was the only transit camp in Belgium. Between 4 August 1942 and 31 July 1944, 28 trains left from near the camp and deported over 25,800 people. Only 1,240 survived the war.

The camp was abandoned at the Liberation of Belgium in September 1944 and subsequently was repurposed for housing. A museum was established in 1996 and today part of the former barracks and a new building opposite form part of the Kazerne Dossin – Memorial, Museum and Documentation Centre on Holocaust and Human Rights, which includes a Holocaust memorial and museum.

Background

German occupation and persecution

Belgium was invaded by Nazi Germany in a rapid military campaign on 10–28 May 1940. It was subsequently placed under a military occupation administration which would endure until July 1944 when the territory briefly passed under a civilian administration, brought to an end by the Liberation of Belgium in September 1944.

As early as September 1940, the German administration established a prison camp in Fort Breendonk, a former Belgian military fort. Inmates were largely political prisoners, though a number of Jews were also held in a segregated part of the camp. As part of the Final Solution after January 1942, it was decided to transport Belgian Jews to concentration and extermination camps in Eastern Europe.

Mechelen transit camp
Approximately 90 percent of Belgium's Jewish population lived in the cities of Antwerp and Brussels in 1942. Accordingly, Mechelen, a city with a railway hub located halfway between the two, was chosen as the site of the new transit camp.

The building chosen to house the camp was a former army facility called Dossin Barracks, built in 1756 and named after Lieutenant-General Émile Dossin de Saint-Georges, a hero of the Battle of the Yser during World War I. It was located in the north of the city and provided access to the railway freight dock serving the River Dyle. The three-storey block that completely surrounded a large square yard was fitted with barbed wire. It became operational in July 1942.

Operation
The camp staff was mostly German but was assisted by Belgian collaborationist paramilitaries from the Algemeene-SS Vlaanderen ("General SS Flanders"). It was officially under the command of Philipp Schmitt, commandant of the Fort Breendonk. The acting commandant at Mechelen was SS officer Rudolph Steckmann.

The first group of people arrived in the camp from Antwerp on 27 July 1942. Between August and December 1942, two transports, each with about 1,000 Jews, left the camp every week for Auschwitz concentration camp. Between 4 August 1942 and 31 July 1944, a total of 28 trains left Mechelen for Poland, carrying 24,916 Jews and 351 Roma; most of them went to Auschwitz. This figure represented more than half of the Belgian Jews murdered during the Holocaust. In line with the Nazi racial policy that much later became named the Romani genocide, 351 Belgian Roma were sent to Auschwitz in early 1944.

Conditions at the Mechelen camp were especially brutal. Many Roma were locked in basement rooms for weeks or months at a time without food or sanitary facilities. The Roma had an especially low survival rate.

Confrontation

Some people succeeded in escaping the transports, especially from the Transports 16 and 17 which consisted of men returned from forced labor on the Atlantic Wall to Belgium. Most of these men jumped between Mechelen and the German border. Many were caught and were soon put on subsequent transports but a total of about 500 Jewish prisoners did manage to escape across all the 28 transports. From this action 17 prisoners managed to flee. More Jews escaped by their own deeds, a total of 231 Jews fled although 90 were eventually recaptured and 26 were shot by guards escorting the train.

The last transport left on 31 July 1944 but Allied forces could not stop it before its destination was reached. When the Allies approached Mechelen by 3 September 1944, the Germans fled the Dossin Barracks, leaving the 527 remaining prisoners behind. Some remaining prisoners escaped that night and the others were freed on the 4th, though soon replaced with suspected collaborators. The lists of deportees were left at Hasselt during the German retreat and were later discovered intact.

Memorial and Museum

In 1948 Dossin Barracks reverted to its original use by the Belgian Army. It was used until 1975 when it was abandoned. Apart from a wing renovated in the 1980s for social housing, the barracks became the site of the Jewish Museum of Deportation and Resistance by 1996. In 2001, the Flemish Government decided to expand the institution by a new complex built opposite the old barracks; the latter closed in July 2011, to become a memorial monument. The Kazerne Dossin – Memorial, Museum and Documentation Centre on Holocaust and Human Rights reopened its doors on 26 November 2012.

See also
 The Holocaust in Belgium
 Belgium in World War II

Notes

References
Citations

Bibliography

 
 

 

 

The Kazerne Dossin – Memorial, Museum and Documentation Centre on Holocaust and Human Rights web site. (Accessed 31 July 2011)
This article incorporates text from the United States Holocaust Memorial Museum, and has been released under the GFDL: Mechelen. Holocaust Encyclopedia. (Accessed 31 July 2011).
Tammy Bottner (2017). "" Among the Reeds. The true story of how a family survived the Holocaust. Oegstgeest: Amsterdam Publishers. .

External links
Transports from Mechelen at European Holocaust Research Infrastructure

Nazi concentration camps in Belgium
Buildings and structures in Mechelen
History of Mechelen